Calytrix plumulosa is a species of plant in the myrtle family Myrtaceae that is endemic to Western Australia.

Description
It usually blooms between October and November producing pink-violet to red star-shaped flowers.

Distribution
Found in the Wheatbelt region of Western Australia where it grows on sandy-loamy soils over laterite.

References

plumulosa
Endemic flora of Western Australia
Rosids of Western Australia
Vulnerable flora of Australia
Plants described in 1895
Taxa named by Ferdinand von Mueller